Chamleh (also Romanized as Chamaleh; also known as Chemle) is a village in Gilvan Rural District, in the Central District of Tarom County, Zanjan Province, Iran. At the 2006 census, its population was 221, in 59 families.

References 

Populated places in Tarom County